Dalia Itzik ( Dalya Itsik; born 20 October 1952) is a former Israeli politician who last served as a member of the Knesset for Kadima. She has previously served in several ministerial positions, and on 4 May 2006 became the first female speaker of the Knesset, and served as President of Israel in an interim capacity in July 2007. She was the first acting President to have been born in Israeli territory after independence in 1948.

Biography
Itzik was born in Jerusalem. Her parents were Iraqi Jews who had immigrated to Israel. Her family was poor; her father was an alcoholic and at times her mother had to steal food for the family to survive. She attended a religious high school, and afterwards, avoided conscription to the Israel Defense Forces by declaring herself religious. She then attended a teacher training course, and went on to obtain a BA in Literature and History from the Hebrew University of Jerusalem and a BA in law from IDC Herzliya. She worked as a teacher, during which she headed the teacher's union in Jerusalem, worked as a deputy to Jerusalem mayor Teddy Kollek, and served as a member of the executive committee of the Israel Broadcasting Authority.

On 26 October 1988, she was involved in a car accident that killed Knesset member Michael Reisser, who was driving to Jerusalem, when Reisser's car crashed into hers. Reisser was fatally wounded and died the following day, while Itzik was seriously injured.

She is married to Danny, an employee of the Israel Electric Corporation. They have three children, Ran, Uri and Adi. The family lives in Jerusalem's Ramat Sharett neighborhood.

Political career
Before being elected to the 13th Knesset in 1992, Itzik served as the deputy mayor of Jerusalem.

After being re-elected in 1996 and 1999, she was appointed Minister of the Environment in Ehud Barak's government, serving from 1999 until 2001. In 2001 she became Minister of Industry and Trade, before leaving the cabinet in 2002.

Re-elected in 2003, Itzik served as Minister of Communications in 2005. In 2006 she defected to Ariel Sharon's newly formed party, Kadima.

Following the 2006 elections she became Knesset speaker. On 25 January 2007, Israeli President Moshe Katzav took a three-month leave of absence, and on 1 July of that year, resigned the office in a plea bargain.  The speaker of the Knesset stands first in the line of succession, making Itzik acting president. She served as the official head of State until Shimon Peres formally took over on 15 July 2007.

After winning third place on the party's list, Itzik retained her seat in the 2009 elections and later became the chairperson of the party. On 5 December 2012, in the days leading up to the 2013 elections while polls showed Kadima either barely getting into the Knesset or not even passing the threshold, Itzik announced she was taking a break from politics and dropping out of the race.

Itzik contested in the 2014 Israeli presidential election, coming third with 28 votes. Her supporters came from across the political spectrum.

References

External links

1952 births
Living people
20th-century Israeli women politicians
21st-century Israeli women politicians
Candidates for President of Israel
Deputy Mayors of Jerusalem
Female heads of state
Hebrew University of Jerusalem alumni
Israeli Jews
Israeli Labor Party politicians
Israeli people of Iraqi-Jewish descent
Jewish Israeli politicians
Jewish women politicians
Kadima politicians
Leaders of the Opposition (Israel)
Members of the 13th Knesset (1992–1996)
Members of the 14th Knesset (1996–1999)
Members of the 15th Knesset (1999–2003)
Members of the 16th Knesset (2003–2006)
Members of the 17th Knesset (2006–2009)
Members of the 18th Knesset (2009–2013)
Ministers of Communications of Israel
Ministers of Environment of Israel
Israeli Mizrahi Jews
One Israel politicians
People from Jerusalem
Speakers of the Knesset
Women government ministers of Israel
Women members of the Knesset